Maharaja Ranjit Singh is an Indian historical drama television series created by Raj Babbar. It was directed by Chitraarth and Sikander Bharti and produced by Nadira Babbar and Kukoo Babbar of Babbar Films Private Limited. The drama aired on DD National from 13 April 2010 to 3 May 2011. The series is based on the life of Maharaja Ranjit Singh and cover's the part of history of Punjab from 1739 to 1812. The show comprised 56 episodes. The music was composed by Jagjit Singh. Filming was done between 2004–2010.

Cast
 Ejlal Ali Khan as Maharaja Ranjit Singh
 Neeta Mohindra as Sada Kaur
 Shahbaz Khan as Jassa Singh Ahluwalia
 Jaspal Sehgal as Charat Singh
 Simmi Sekhon as Desan Kaur
Jitinder Khaira as Maha Singh
Tasreen as Raj Kaur
Navneet Cheema as Maharani Datar Kaur
 Dr. Ranjit Sharma as Kaura Mal
 Rajendra Gupta as Adina Beg
 Rishikesh Sharma as Muhammad Shah
 Chetan Batra as Ahmad Shah Durrani
 Shaikh Sami as Zakariya Khan Bahadur
 Rajveer Bawa as Massa Ranghar
 Davinder Daman as Fateh Miyan
 Hardeep Gill as Dewan Mokham Chand
 Surjit Dhami as Dal Singh
 Gurcharan Arora as Jodh Singh Ramgarhia
Sandeep Singh as Hari Singh Bhangi
Amandeep Singh as Bhai Gurdit Singh
Anita Devgan as Mato (Maharani Mehtab Kaur's maid)
Vibha Bhagat as Guddo (Ranjit Singh's proclaimed sister)
 Ahmad Harhash as Yuvraj Malhotra (Guddo's sister)

See also
 Dal Khalsa (Sikh army)
 Sikh Misls
 Sikh Empire

References

External links 
 Maharaja Ranjit Singh TV Series, Maharaja Ranjit Singh TV Show, TV, DD1, started this project in 2004-05

Indian period television series
2010 Indian television series debuts
Indian historical television series
Television series set in the 19th century
Ranjit Singh
DD National original programming
2000s Indian television series
Television series set in the 18th century
Television shows set in Lahore
Sikhism in fiction
Cultural depictions of Indian monarchs